Give and Take is an album by American jazz double-bassist John Lindberg, George E. Lewis and Barry Altschul, recorded in 1982 for the Italian Black Saint label.

Reception
The AllMusic review awarded the album four stars. The Penguin Guide to Jazz awarded it three and a half out of four stars, calling it "the one to go for" out of Lindberg's discography.

Track listing
All compositions by John Lindberg except as indicated
 "Give and Take" - 6:52 
 "Float" - 7:14 
 "Be Out S'cool" (Barry Altschul) - 5:59 
 "Shunk-Shank" - 6:12 
 "Stick Figures" (George Lewis) - 7:28 
 "Drift" - 7:30 
Recorded at Barigozzi Studio in Milano, Italy, on November 13 and 14, 1982

Personnel
John Lindberg – bass
George E. Lewis – trombone
Barry Altschul – drums, berimbau, marimba, tympani

References

Black Saint/Soul Note albums
John Lindberg albums
1982 albums